Lachneratus phasmaticus, also known as the phantom cardinalfish, is a species of fish in the family Apogonidae, the cardinalfishes. It is the only member of its genus. It is native to the tropical eastern Pacific and Indian Oceans. This fish can be found in crevices and underwater caves, and it occurs at depths of 3 to 104 m.

This species was discovered when "an unusual cardinalfish was taken in a trawl off of Hawaii" around 1969. It was later collected off of Fiji. It was described to science in 1991 and placed in a new genus.

Etymology
The name of the genus honors the American ichthyologist Ernest A. Lachner (1915–1996), who was curator emeritus at the United States National Museum in recognition of his contributions to the systematics of the Indo-Pacific cardinalfishes.

References

Apogoninae
Monotypic fish genera
Fish described in 1991
Taxa named by Thomas H. Fraser
Taxa named by Paul J. Struhsaker